Viitasoo is a village in Hiiumaa Parish, Hiiu County in northwestern Estonia.

References

Villages in Hiiu County